Kim Si-jin (Hangul:김시진, Hanja: 金始眞; born March 20, 1958 in Pohang, Gyeongsangbuk-do, South Korea) is a retired pitcher and a former manager in the Korea Baseball Organization.

Playing career

Amateur career 
Upon graduation from Daegu Commerce High School, Kim joined the Hanyang University baseball team in 1977.

In , as a freshman at Hanyang University, he was selected for the South Korea national baseball team to compete the 3rd Intercontinental Cup. Kim appeared in the final game as a starting pitcher and hurled two shutout innings to lead his team to a 5–4 victory over United States.

In , Kim was called up to the South Korea national baseball team for the 1982 Baseball World Cup hosted by South Korea. Kim led Team Korea to its first champion in the event, appearing two games as a starting pitcher.

Notable international careers

Professional career 
Kim was selected by the Samsung Lions in the second round of the 1983 KBO Draft. Kim finished his rookie season with a 17–12 record and a 2.55 ERA, throwing 17 complete games (runner-up in the league). He led all pitchers in shutouts (5) and was ranked third in wins, strikeouts (154), and innings pitched (229.1). After the season, Kim finished third in the Rookie of the Year voting.

Kim was 25-5 in 1985, with a 2.00 ERA and 201 strikeouts. He was the Most Valuable Player of the 1985 All-Star Game and along with fellow 25-game-winner Kim ll-young, led the Lions to the Korean Series championship. For his efforts that year he was given the Golden Glove Award for the best pitcher in the league.

In 1987 Kim went 23-6 with a 3.12 ERA and again won the Golden Glove Award.

Prior to the 1989 season, Kim and Jang Hyo-jo were traded to the Lotte Giants for Choi Dong-won and Kim Yong-chul.

Coaching career 
After retiring from the Lotte Giants, Kim started his coaching career as the pitching coach of Pacific Dolphins. In 1996, Dolphins were bought by Hyundai and Kim kept on coaching the Unicorns. In 2006, after manager Kim Jae-bak left the Unicorns, Kim Si-jin took his place. in 2008, he became the first manager of the Woori Heroes, which became Nexen Heroes in 2010. He managed Lotte in 2013–2014.

External links 
Career statistics and player information from Korea Baseball Organization

Hyundai Unicorns managers
Lotte Giants managers
Kiwoom Heroes managers
Lotte Giants players
Samsung Lions players
South Korean baseball players
People from Pohang
1958 births
Living people
South Korean baseball managers
South Korean baseball coaches
Hanyang University alumni
Sportspeople from North Gyeongsang Province